FPCT Tumaini Secondary School, is the private school located in the Southern part of Tanzania in Katavi region, formerly Rukwa Region.

The school was established in 2005  by the Free Pentecostal Church of Tanzania under the Manager, archbishop of the Katumba Parish Rev. Jonathan Kidebuye. The school now serves large number of population in Tanzania especially people from Lake zone regions: Mwanza, Shinyanga, Bariadi, Kagera, and  Mara, central zone regions of Tabora, Dodoma and Singida. It is accommodates a large number of people from the Southern zone Regions of Tanzania. 
The school is about 31 Kilometers from Katavi capital Town of Mpanda.

School Motto 

The Motto of the school is Fear for the Lord is the Beginning of the Knowledge (Kumcha Bwana ni chanzo cha Maarifa), the school other than preparing the students academically it as well prepares them spiritually, every student based on his/her religion.

References 

Secondary schools in Tanzania
Private schools
Private schools in Tanzania
Pentecostal churches